Grand Prix is a British television programme based on the Formula One World Championship. It had three main presenters during its history: Murray Walker from 1978 to 1996, Jake Humphrey from 2009 to 2012 and Suzi Perry from 2013 to 2015. Among the more occasional hosts were Steve Rider, Des Lynam, Sue Barker and Lee McKenzie.

Production
In the early days of the programme, all races were commentated at BBC Television Centre in London due to the high costs of travelling to races with live broadcasts done on location. The team would not usually travel to non-European races to commentate unless another broadcaster paid for the travel expenses. Murray Walker would usually be flown to the location of the tracks to record a short scene before returning to England to watch the race from London with some broadcasts having commentary live with highlights aired or recorded commentary in highlights. On occasions the BBC employed a "ghost commentator" which was someone who would be in touch with the production team in London and gained access to timing monitors so that cameras could record what was occurring off the track. The first "ghost commentator" was Mark Fogarty with Joe Saward taking over in the early 1990s.

Conception
Following the excitement and interest of the 1976 Formula One season, the BBC decided to cover all races from 1978. The BBC originally wanted to have Raymond Baxter as commentator but his commitments with Tomorrow's World and air shows that aired on BBC taking his priority, BBC had Murray Walker on their list as well and Walker got the job.
The corporation had initially shown the odd race that featured on the calendar from 1959 till 1977 either live in segments or in highlights but elected to go with as many races as possible from 1978.

History

1978–1996
The first broadcast of the programme came at the 1978 Monaco Grand Prix and the show featured one of the most iconic theme tunes in sport, with Fleetwood Mac's "The Chain".

In 1978, The BBC showed 11 races, Monaco, Belgium, Spain, France, Britain, Germany, Austria, Holland, Italy, United States and Canada. Most of their highlight shows were aired on BBC Two late at night, The British Grand Prix was shown Live in Grandstand on BBC One and they aired Highlights of the Canadian Grand Prix on the Wednesday after the race on Sportsnight on BBC One.

1979 saw Monaco and Britain Live on BBC One, Highlights of all their races were shown on BBC Two except Brazil which was aired on the Wednesday after the race on Sportsnight on BBC One and the Austrian Grand Prix which was not aired due to a TV dispute with host broadcaster ORF and the race promoters. From the Italian Grand Prix onwards saw James Hunt join the commentary booth alongside Walker after Hunt announced his retirement from racing that year. 

From 1981 onwards, they showed some of the races live in Sunday Grandstand and the rest as highlights in Grand Prix. 
By 1981 all of the European races with the summer races shown live in segments on Sunday Grandstand with it shown in full by the late 1980s, with highlights on the Grand Prix programme. Some races were shown on Grand Prix due to either race times in the morning/evening or because Grandstand was showing another major event like tennis or snooker at the same time. Hunt missed the 1989 Belgian Grand Prix because of food poisoning. 1992 saw Jonathan Palmer join as a pit reporter for the live races but following the 1993 Canadian Grand Prix, Hunt died from a heart attack and was replaced in the commentary box by Palmer. For the following race in France, BBC aired a tribute show to Hunt following their highlights show. In 1995, all the races were shown live and all qualifying sessions were shown live in 1996. previously qualifying was shown as a brief report during Grandstand, apart from qualifying for the British Grand Prix which was generally shown live and in full. Many of these live races were fronted by either then Grandstand presenter Steve Rider or former tennis player Sue Barker.

End of Grand Prix
In 1995 it was announced that the BBC had lost the television broadcast rights to Formula One to ITV for the 1997 season. Murray Walker would continue in his role as the lead commentator. The final race broadcast by the programme was the 1996 Japanese Grand Prix in which viewers saw Damon Hill win his only world championship. The loss of coverage was an example of BBC Sport department's decline in the late 1990s.

2009–2011
In March 2008, ITV announced the coverage would be transferred to the BBC from the 2009 season. The 2010 Korean Grand Prix saw a delay of the start by 10 minutes and a red flag after three laps which lasted 45 minutes both in rain. That resulted in coverage initially delaying The Andrew Marr Show which was scheduled at 9:15am before the rest of the race was moved from BBC One to BBC Two at 9:30am which resulted in 273 viewers complaining that they had set their PVRs to record the race but had missed out on its climax, when most of the exciting incidents occurred. BBC spokesman said to The Guardian "Sunday's Korean Grand Prix was delayed due to extreme weather. The subsequent disruption to the schedule was flagged up to the audience throughout via the commentary and was also made clear again just prior to switching the coverage to BBC Two. However, the BBC also has a responsibility to reflect a wide range of interests and therefore the decision was taken to switch the F1 coverage to BBC Two until its conclusion." The 2011 Canadian Grand Prix saw a red flag that lasted 120 minutes, that resulted in coverage initially cancelling Antiques Roadshow which was scheduled to air at 8:00pm before coverage of the Grand Prix switched to BBC Two and BBC HD at 9:00pm, that resulted in 700 fans complaining about the cancellation of Antiques Roadshow in favour of the Grand Prix. During this era Grand Prix was broadcast on BBC Three showing highlights alongside the main live broadcast, normally at 7pm on Sunday evenings except for Canada and Brazil which aired late at night due to the late start time, with the British Grand Prix on BBC One.

2012–2015
In July 2011, BBC announced that half their races would be live from 2012 and got a contract to 2018 with Sky Sports covering all races. Martin Brundle and Ted Kravitz left BBC for Sky and the end of 2011 and were replaced by Ben Edwards as lead commentator and former Jordan Grand Prix designer Gary Anderson joining as reporter and technical analyst. Jake Humphrey continued to host, Eddie Jordan analysed on live races and David Coulthard stayed as colour commentator. Humphrey was forced to skip Canada and Europe due to him hosting Euro 2012 for BBC's Match of the Day and then skipped Germany and Hungary due to him hosting the 2012 Olympics for BBC, Lee McKenzie filled in for him at these races and her role was taken by Tom Clarkson. Humphrey left at the end of 2012 to join BT Sport and was replaced by Suzi Perry, Allan McNish joined as analyst and Clarkson joined full time. BBC aired all three practice session for their live races on BBC Two or BBC Three. Anderson left at the end of 2013. The BBC kept their remaining staff for 2014 and 2015.

Grand Prix axed
In late 2015, BBC wanted a budget cut of £21 million to the sports department. In December 2015, BBC axed Grand Prix as part of their budget cuts and was replaced by Channel 4 from 2016.Coulthard, Jordan, Edwards and McKenzie all joined Channel 4 in the same roles.

Some episodes are still available but hidden on the BBC's website.

Broadcast history

Presenters

Races
Here's the history of the broadcasts BBC did on BBC One, BBC Two, BBC Three, BBC HD, or BBC Red Button.

Documentaries

Notable moments

 The 1979 French Grand Prix where Gilles Villeneuve and René Arnoux had a tremendous battle for second place in the closing laps and is considered to be one of the finest motorsports battles of all time.
 The 1982 Monaco Grand Prix where the lead changed five times in the last five laps.
 The fatal accident of Riccardo Paletti at the 1982 Canadian Grand Prix.
 The 1991 Australian Grand Prix which had been the shortest race in history until the 2021 Belgian Grand Prix.
 Nigel Mansell winning the 1992 Championship after many failed attempts.
 Ayrton Senna's dominating win at Donington Park in the 1993 European Grand Prix.
 The deaths of Roland Ratzenberger and Ayrton Senna at the 1994 San Marino Grand Prix.
 Michael Schumacher winning the 1994 Championship in controversial circumstances.
 Damon Hill winning the 1996 Championship in Japan with Murray Walker saying live "And I've got to stop, because I've got a lump in my throat."
 Jenson Button and Brawn GP winning their debut race at the 2009 Australian Grand Prix first race of the revived series
 Button winning the longest race in F1 history 04:04:39.537 at the 2011 Canadian Grand Prix This broadcast ran for six hours over two channels 
 The fatal accident of Jules Bianchi at the 2014 Japanese Grand Prix
 Lewis Hamilton becoming a three time champion and first British driver to successfully defend a championship 2015 United States Grand Prix

Notes

References

External links
 Andrew Benson's Blog Archives 

1978 British television series debuts
2015 British television series endings
British television series revived after cancellation
BBC Sport
BBC Television shows
1970s British sports television series
1980s British sports television series
1990s British sports television series
2000s British sports television series
2010s British sports television series
Formula One mass media